Mount Pleasant Municipal Airport  is a city-owned public-use airport located three nautical miles (6 km) southeast of the central business district of Mount Pleasant, a city in Henry County, Iowa, United States. According to the FAA's National Plan of Integrated Airport Systems for 2009–2013, it is categorized as a general aviation facility.

Facilities and aircraft 
It has two runways: 15/33 is 4,001 by 75 feet (1,220 x 23 m) with an asphalt; 3/21 is 1,965 by 120 feet (599 x 37 m) with a turf surface.

For the 12-month period ending May 13, 2009, the airport had 6,250 aircraft operations, an average of 17 per day: 96% general aviation and 4% air taxi. At that time there were 19 aircraft based at this airport: 47% single-engine, 42% multi-engine and 11% ultralight.

References

External links 
 Mount Pleasant Municipal (MPZ) at Iowa DOT Airport Directory
 Aerial image as of 20 May 1994 from USGS The National Map
 

Airports in Iowa
Transportation buildings and structures in Henry County, Iowa